The Velo-Dog (also known as a Revolver de Poche) was a pocket revolver originally created in France by René Galand, son of Charles-François Galand in the late 19th-century as a defense for cyclists against dog attacks. The name is a compound word composed of "velocipede" and "dog".

Surviving examples vary considerably in appearance, but have certain features in common. The hammer is shrouded to avoid its snagging on clothing, so the weapon is double action only.  All have short barrels and originally fired the 5.75 mm (.22 calibre) Velo-dog cartridge, although many of the Velo-Dogs produced after 1900 accepted .22 LR or .25 ACP rounds.  Another feature on many late models Velo-Dogs is the lack of a trigger guard, and a trigger that folds into the body of the weapon when not in use.  For the more humane, there were cartridges loaded with cayenne pepper or dust, or which had bullets made from wax, wood or cork.

The original revolver uses the  Galand company's proprietary 5.75mm Velo-dog cartridge, a centrefire 5.5 mm (nominally 5.75) cartridge slightly less powerful than the 22 Long Rifle, using a jacketed bullet. The cartridge is, or was until very recently, still made by Fiocchi.

Despite the low energy of the round, a suicide case was recorded where a woman shot herself twice in the temple with a .25 (6.35 mm) Velo-dog revolver before succumbing.

In popular culture
 A Velo-dog makes a minor appearance as an assassin's concealable pistol in the novel The Death of Achilles, one of Boris Akunin's Erast Fandorin series.

See also
Bossu Revolver

References
Notes

Sources

External links

(Spanish)
 



Revolvers of France
Revolvers
Early revolvers
.22 LR revolvers
History of cycling